Liao Keli (born 5 January 1990) is a Chinese para table tennis player. He won one of the bronze medals in the men's individual C7 event at the 2020 Summer Paralympics held in Tokyo, Japan. He also won the gold medal in the men's team C6–7 event.

References

External links
 

Living people
1990 births
Chinese male table tennis players
Paralympic table tennis players of China
Paralympic gold medalists for China
Paralympic bronze medalists for China
Paralympic medalists in table tennis
Table tennis players at the 2012 Summer Paralympics
Table tennis players at the 2016 Summer Paralympics
Table tennis players at the 2020 Summer Paralympics
Medalists at the 2020 Summer Paralympics
Table tennis players from Chongqing
21st-century Chinese people